The 2000 BMW Open was an Association of Tennis Professionals men's tennis tournament played on outdoor clay courts at the MTTC Iphitos in Munich, Germany. It was the 84th edition of the tournament and was held from 1 May to 8 May 2000. Seventh-seeded Franco Squillari won the singles title.

Finals

Singles

 Franco Squillari defeated  Tommy Haas 6–4, 6–4
 It was Squillari's 1st title of the year and the 2nd of his career.

Doubles

 David Adams /  John-Laffnie de Jager defeated  Max Mirnyi /  Nenad Zimonjić 6–4, 6–4
 It was Adams's 3rd title of the year and the 16th of his career. It was de Jager's 3rd title of the year and the 7th of his career.

References

External links 
Association of Tennis Professionals (ATP) – tournament profile

 
BMW Open
Bavarian International Tennis Championships